Helicteulia is a genus of moths belonging to the family Tortricidae.

Species
Helicteulia heos  Razowski, 1988

See also
List of Tortricidae genera

References

 , 1988, Acta zoologica cracoviensia 31: 387.
 , 2005, World Catalogue of Insects 5

External links
tortricidae.com

Euliini
Tortricidae genera